Piz Sampuoir (3,023 m) is a mountain in the Sesvenna Range of the Alps, located north of Il Fuorn (east of Zernez) in the canton of Graubünden. Its summit is the tripoint between the Val Sampuoir, the Val dal Spöl and the Val Plavna.

References

External links
 Piz Sampuoir on Hikr

Mountains of the Alps
Mountains of Graubünden
Mountains of Switzerland
Scuol
Zernez